Long, McCorkle and Murray Houses is a set of three historic homes and national historic district located at Newton, Catawba County, North Carolina. The McCorkle House (c. 1890) reflects the popular Queen Anne style, while the Long (c. 1902–1910) and Murray (c. 1920) houses represent variations of the Bungalow style.  The Long House property includes a contributing garage, servant's house, and landscape design.

It was listed on the National Register of Historic Places in 1990.

References

Houses on the National Register of Historic Places in North Carolina
Historic districts on the National Register of Historic Places in North Carolina
Houses completed in 1890
Queen Anne architecture in North Carolina
Houses in Catawba County, North Carolina
National Register of Historic Places in Catawba County, North Carolina